The Iron Tram Bridge, Robertstown is an early example of a "railway" bridge. It crosses the River Cynon between Trecynon and Robertstown. It carried the Llwydcoed Tramroad ( gauge) which ran from Hirwaun to the canal head at Cwmbach, south east of Aberdare. It was built by the Aberdare Canal & Navigation Company in 1811, and probably designed by George Overton.

Little remains of the tramroad but its route is now a footpath. The bridge is a scheduled monument and a Grade II listed building.

References

Grade II listed buildings in Rhondda Cynon Taf
Bridges in Rhondda Cynon Taf